Alen Stajcic (born 2 November 1973) is a former Australian soccer player and is the head coach of the Philippines women's national football team. While as a footballer he was a NSW Premier League player and an Australian Youth Representative.

Since turning his hand to coaching he had become the head coach of the NSWIS women's soccer team, head coach of the Hills Sports High School Football Program and the head coach of the Australia women's national under-20 soccer team. 
He was appointed coach for Sydney FC in the first season of the Australian W-League. From 2014 to 2019, he was the head coach of the Matildas.

He helped the Philippines qualify for the 2023 FIFA Women's World Cup, which was the country's first ever appearance in a World Cup, when he led the team to the semifinals of the 2022 AFC Women's Asian Cup.

Club career
A former NSW Premier League player and captain with Bonnyrigg, Bankstown and Sutherland, Alen represented New South Wales at the youth level and played for several clubs within the National Youth League and Winter Super League.

Managerial career

Alen Stajcic had been the head coach of the NSWIS Women's Football Program from 2002–2013. Widely considered as the one of the best football nurseries in Australia, the program produced over 30 senior Internationals in that 10-year period. He was also the head coach of the Women's National Soccer League side, the NSW Sapphires, which he guided to a premiership in the 2003/04 season. 
He started as head coach of HSHS in the foundation year (2003) and has gone on to win many titles and good performances. 

In 2006, he was the assistant coach for the Young Matildas while they were competing at the FIFA U/20's Women's Championships in Russia. Unfortunately they bowed out in the group stage, missing the next round by 1 point to Brazil and Russia. As of 05/03/07 Stajcic became the Young Matildas Coach.

In 2008, Stajcic became the inaugural Sydney FC Women's head coach, until 2014. They qualified for the semi finals in all 6 seasons, winning 2 grand finals and 2 premierships along the way. In 2013, Sydney FC beat Japanese powerhouse NTV Beleza and Sth American Champions Colo Colo to claim 3rd place the IWCC in Japan.

Australia women
As of September 2014, Stajcic was appointed full-time head coach of the Australian Women's National Football team, the Matildas. In the 2015 Women's World Cup in Canada, they became the 1st Senior Australian Football Team to win a knockout match in a World Cup when they defeated Brazil 1–0 in the Round of 16 before losing 1–0 to Japan in the quarter finals. Earlier in 2014, Stajcic had led the Matildas in an Interim capacity, to a Silver Medal at the Asian Championships.

Currently, Stajcic stands as the only Australian-born head coach to win a match at a FIFA World Cup.

In March 2016, the Matildas qualified for the Olympic Games for the first time in 12 years. Along the way eliminating World Cup finalists Japan. The Matildas topped the Asian Qualifying group and were undefeated in the tournament. The Matildas subsequently attained their highest-ever FIFA Ranking of 5. At the 2016 Rio Olympics Australia were grouped with Canada, Germany and Zimbabwe. Australia progressed through to the Quarter Finals, where they were beaten 7–6 on penalties by Hosts Brazil after a 0–0 draw.

Despite qualifying for the 2019 Women's World Cup, Stajcic was sacked from his position by Football Federation Australia for reasons that were not made clear by the FFA at the time of the sacking, with FFA board member Heather Reid making cryptic remarks about how people "would be shocked" if they knew the reasons, with leaks to the media resulting in Lucy Zelic claiming the facts were legally confidential. Australian player Sam Kerr posted on twitter saying "My trust was in Staj to lead us to the World Cup final & I believe he was the best coach for that". Stajcic took legal action against the FFA for the sacking and the veil of secrecy behind it, and in May 2019 this legal action lead to a settlement with a 'six figure' settlement accounting for the loss of potential World Cup bonuses and reputation damage. Heather Reid said in a statement following the settlement, "I apologise unreservedly for the damage, distress and hurt that I have caused to Alen Stajcic as a professional football coach".

Central Coast Mariners
Following the sacking of Mike Mulvey from Central Coast Mariners, on 12 March 2019 Stajcic was appointed as the caretaker head coach for the club. On 2 May 2019, Stajcic was appointed head coach on a 3-year contract until the end of the 2021–22 A-League season. In the final 6 games of season he was in charge for 2 wins and 4 losses.

The 2019/20 season was his first as the full time head coach, and the Mariners finished in last place with 5 wins, 3 draws and 18 losses from 26 games.

The early stages of the 2020/21 season went very well for the Mariners, and they won 5 of the first 7 matches, putting them in outright first place with 15 points. After initially leading the league at the season's halfway point, the Mariners ended up finishing the regular season in third place, the club's highest league finish since 2014, with the club achieving a record of 12 wins, 6 draws and 8 losses. The Mariners' season ended with a 2-0 elimination final loss to Macarthur FC.

On 17 June 2021, Stajcic confirmed his departure from the Mariners.

Philippines women
In late October 2021, Stajcic was appointed as head coach of the Malditas, the Philippines women's national football team, ahead of the 2022 AFC Women's Asian Cup. By reaching the semifinals, following a penalty shootout win over Chinese Taipei, the Philippines qualified for the 2023 FIFA Women's World Cup, the first time the side had ever qualified. Stajcic became the only Australian-born coach to qualify for 3 FIFA World Cups. In March 2022, Stajcic would renew his contract with the Philippines which is set to last until the World Cup despite offers from Australia and Europe. In his guidance, he helped the team winning the 2022 AFF Women's Championship, the country's first regional trophy by blanking Thailand in the final 3-0.

Stajcic and his assistant Nahuel Arrarte were also appointed in January 2023 to oversee the under-17 and under-20 women's national teams.

Managerial statistics

Honours

W-league Coach of the Year: 2010–11
W-league Coach of the Year: 2013–14
Inducted into Sydney FC Hall of Fame: 2015
 Australian Institute of Sport Coach of the Year: 2017

As a player
Australian Schoolboy International: 1992

As a coach
Philippines Women's National Team
AFF Women's Championship: 2022
Semi-finalists, Asian Cup: 2022
Qualified for World Cup: 2023 (debut)
Bronze medalists, Southeast Asian Games: 2021

Central Coast Mariners A-league Team
FFA Cup Semi-Finalists: 2019/20
A-league Finalists 2020/21

Australian Women's National Team
Finalists, Asian Cup: 2014, 2018
Quarter Finalist, World Cup: 2015
Quarter Finalist, Olympics: 2016
Tournament of Nations Winners: 2017
Record high FIFA World Ranking of 4: 2017

Sydney FC Women's Team
Semi Finalists: 2008, 2011–12, 2013–14
Premiers: 2009, 2010–11
Champions: 2009, 2012–13
Finalists: 2010–11
3rd Place International Women's Club Championship: 2013

Young Matilda's (As Assistant Coach)
Qualified for World U-20's Women Championships: 2006
Knocked out in Group Stage

NSW Sapphires
Winner of Nation Women's Soccer League: 2003–04
Finalists of Nation Women's Soccer League: 2002–03

References

External links
Womens NSWIS Soccer Program

1973 births
Living people
People from New South Wales
Australian soccer players
Australian soccer coaches
Bonnyrigg White Eagles FC players
Sutherland Sharks FC players
Australian people of Serbian descent
2015 FIFA Women's World Cup managers
Association football midfielders
Australia women's national soccer team managers
Central Coast Mariners FC non-playing staff
Australian expatriates in the Philippines
Australian expatriate soccer coaches